This is an alphabetical index of all articles related to the continent of Antarctica.

0–9 
70th parallel south
80th parallel south

A
Aboa (research station)
Aeneas Mackintosh
Amundsen's South Pole expedition
Antarctica
Antarctic Circle
Antarctica Day
Antarctic gateway cities
Antarctic Peninsula
Antarctic realm
Antarctic krill
Antarctic microorganisms

B
British Antarctic Survey
British Antarctic Territory

C
Carsten Borchgrevink
Climate of Antarctica

D
Demographics of Antarctica
Discovery Expedition

E
East Antarctica
Emilio Palma
Emperor penguin
Ernest Joyce
Ernest Shackleton

F
Fabian Gottlieb von Bellingshausen
Far Eastern Party
Farthest South
Flag of Antarctica
Flora of Antarctica

G
Glacier
Graham Land

H
Harry McNish

I
Ice shelf
Imperial Trans-Antarctic Expedition

J
Japanese Antarctic Expedition

K
King Edward VII Land

L
Little Rockford

M
McMurdo Station
Mikhail Lazarev

N
New South Greenland
Nimrod Expedition

O

P
Polar route includes flights over the Arctic and Antarctic.

Q

R
Robert Falcon Scott
Ross Ice Shelf
Ross Island
Ross Sea
Ross Sea party

S

SY Aurora's drift
Scottish National Antarctic Expedition
Shackleton–Rowett Expedition
South Pole
Southern Cross Expedition

T
Terra Nova Expedition
Territorial claims in Antarctica
Time in Antarctica
Tom Crean (explorer)

U

V
Victoria Land
Voyage of the James Caird

W
West Antarctica
Wildlife of Antarctica
William Speirs Bruce

X

Y

Z

See also

Antarctica-related articles
Indexes of topics by region